The Canton of Rosières-en-Santerre is a former canton situated in the department of the Somme and in the Picardie region of northern France. It was disbanded following the French canton reorganisation which came into effect in March 2015. It had 9,296 inhabitants (2012).

Geography 
The canton is organised around the commune of Rosières-en-Santerre in the arrondissement of Montdidier. The altitude varies from 52m (Guillaucourt) to 106m (Bouchoir) for an average of 91m.

The canton comprised 20 communes:

Bayonvillers
Beaufort-en-Santerre
Bouchoir
Caix
La Chavatte
Chilly
Folies
Fouquescourt
Fransart
Guillaucourt
Hallu
Harbonnières
Maucourt
Méharicourt
Parvillers-le-Quesnoy
Punchy
Rosières-en-Santerre
Rouvroy-en-Santerre
Vrély
Warvillers

Population

See also
 Arrondissements of the Somme department
 Cantons of the Somme department
 Communes of the Somme department

References

Rosieres-en-Santerre
2015 disestablishments in France
States and territories disestablished in 2015